Valu is a 2008 Indian comedy Marathi film directed by Umesh Vinayak Kulkarni. The film featured in various international film festivals as The Wild Bull. It also became the first Marathi film to be selected in Rotterdam International Film Festival 2008, the Netherlands.

Plot
In the small village of Kusavde, there is a lonely misunderstood wild bull. The bull, "Valu", is actually a holy, consecrated bull which is the responsibility of the village. It is allowed to roam free and is the responsibility of the entire village. But lately, Valu becomes very aggressive and is blamed for every single act of chaos and destruction that happens in and around the village. Now, catching the bull becomes equivalent to establishing power in the village for the leaders and for those who are interested in the fringe benefits.

The film intertwines various stories of the war between the two leaders; love stories that bloom in the midst of the adventure; an amateur filmmaker who struggles to shoot a documentary; the forest officer who leads this chaos like a sacred mission along with the religious priest; the tricksters and an insane woman who seems to understand the mind of Valu.

Cast
 Atul Kulkarni as Swanand Gaddamwar aka "Foresht"
 Mohan Agashe as Sarapanch
 Bharati Achrekar as Sarapanch's Wife
 Girish Kulkarni as Jeevan
 Veena Jamkar as Tani
 Dilip Prabhavalkar as Pandit
 Nirmiti Sawant as Pandit's Wife
 Nandu Madhav as Aaba
 Renuka Daftardar as Aaba's Wife
 Mangesh Satpute as Shiva
 Amruta Subhash as Sangi
 Satish Tare as Satya
 Chandrakant Gokhale as Aaja
 Jyoti Subhash as Sakhubai
 Shrikant Yadav as Suresh
 Ashwini Giri as Suresh' Wife
 Deepak Alegaonkar as Shivai's Father
 Rajesh More as Sangi's father
 Meghana Vaidya as Sangi's Mother
 Siddheshwar Zadbuke as Popat
 Prashant Tapaswi as Shankrya
 Nikhil Raut as Ganya
 Vrishasen Dabholkar as Sameer aka "Documentary"
 Ashok Kulkarni as Jagnade
 Pournima Ganu as Gaddam's Wife
 Sharavi Kulkarni as Sampi
 Aditya Kulkarni as Sampat
 Raja (bull) as Valu

Selection in Film Festivals
 5th Asian Film Festival, 2007 Pune: Selected for screening as a closing film for the festival.
 37th Rotterdam International Film Festival, 2008 the Netherlands 
 24th Warsaw International Film Festival, 2008 Poland
 Karlovy Vary International Film Festival, 2008 Czech Republic
 Reykjavik International Film Festival, 2008 Iceland
 Warsaw International FilmFest, 2008 Poland
 La Rochelle International Film Festival, 2010 France

Awards and achievements
 Best Director: Umesh Vinayak Kulkarni, Best Cinematographer: Sudhir Palsane (Pune International Film Festival 2008)
 Best Eye-Catching Film of the Year, Best Supporting Actor: Girish Kulkarni (Zee Gaurav Awards 2008)
 Best Film of 2008, Best Director: Umesh Vinayak Kulkarni Maharashtra Times Awards - MaTa Sanman 2008)

References

External links
 
 http://www.valuthefilm.com
 The Hindu : Friday Review Delhi / Interview : Free spirit gets away
 http://www.expressindia.com/latest-news/Marathi-film-ValuThe-Wild-Bull-premieres-at-Rotterdam/267089/

2008 films
2000s Marathi-language films